Events from the year 1575 in India.

Events
 March 3 – The Battle of Tukaroi was fought.

See also

 Timeline of Indian history

References